The White Bull (also known as the White Bull Inn) is a public house and inn on Church Street (formerly one of the Roman Watling Streets) in the English village of Ribchester, Lancashire. It dates to 1707 and is a Grade II listed building with some unique exterior features.

The building, which overlooks The Hillock, the ancient centre of the village, is made of sandstone with slate roofs, in two storeys and four bays.  On the front is a protruding two-storey gabled porch with two pairs of Doric columns, possibly taken from a nearby Roman fort, specifically the tepidarium of the Roman baths. They are believed to have been recovered from the bed of the River Ribble.

The doorway has a moulded surround.  Above the portico is a rustic wooden representation of a white bull. The right bay has been altered and contains a door and modern shop windows.  To the left, a former stable has a doorway with a plain surround, a blocked doorway converted into a window with a dated lintel, and a circular pitching hole. The original door, to the right of today's, was filled in in the 1940s.

In the late 18th century, the building also served as the local courthouse for many years, with one of its rooms used for holding prisoners.

The inn, which has three rooms, was put up for sale, in January 2017, at an asking price in excess of £385,000. It was bought by the Brooks family, who had previously owned it around the turn of the century, and was refurbished.

The pub was patronised by the members of Time Team during their three-day visit to the village in September 1993 which was focused on nearby 2 Church Street.

Gallery

References

Sources

See also
Listed buildings in Ribchester

External links
White Bull Ribchester official website
The White Bull's appearance in Time Team, 1994

Grade II listed buildings in Lancashire
Pubs in Lancashire
Restaurants in Lancashire
Hotels in Lancashire
Buildings and structures in Ribchester
1707 establishments in England